Diosdado "Dado" Madarang Peralta (born March 27, 1952) is a Filipino attorney and jurist who served as the chief justice of the Philippines from 2019 to 2021. He previously served as an associate justice of the Supreme Court of the Philippines from January 13, 2009, to October 22, 2019. He is the third Sandiganbayan presiding justice to be appointed to the high tribunal.

Personal life and education 

Peralta finished his Bachelor of Science degree at the Colegio de San Juan de Letran in 1974 before pursuing law at the University of Santo Tomas Faculty of Civil Law, where he graduated in 1979. He is married to Fernanda Lampas-Peralta, an associate justice of the Philippine Court of Appeals.

Career

Legal career 
Peralta worked in the private sector before joining government service as an assistant city prosecutor in Laoag City and Manila.

Jurist 

On September 22, 1994, Peralta was appointed judge of the Regional Trial Court, Branch 95, Quezon City, which was designated as Special Criminal Court on Heinous Crimes and, later, Drugs Cases, then named to the Sandiganbayan in 2002 by President Gloria Macapagal-Arroyo. He was designated presiding justice of the Sandiganbayan in March 2008, and served in that capacity until his appointment to the Supreme Court. Peralta is the chairperson of the High Court's Committee on the Revision of the Benchbook on the Application, Computation, and Graduation of Penalties. He previously sat as a member of the House of Representative Electoral Tribunal (HET). Peralta was the chairman of the 2014 Philippine Bar Examination committee.

Chief Justice 
On October 23, 2019, Peralta was appointed by President Rodrigo Duterte as the Chief Justice of the Supreme Court of the Philippines, succeeding Lucas Bersamin.

In December 2020, he announced that he would retire on March 27, 2021; a year earlier than his required mandatory retirement, of which he was succeeded as chief justice by Alexander Gesmundo on April 5, 2021.

Awards 

Peralta was the recipient of several commendations, two of which were the Special Centennial Awards in the Field of Criminal Law, given by the Integrated Bar of the Philippines and the Supreme Court during its centennial celebration on June 6, 2001, and the Judicial Excellence Awards 2002 (Chief Justice Ramon Avanceña Award for Outstanding Regional Trial Court Judge). In recognition of his vast contribution in the field of law, he was also the recipient of the Outstanding Thomasian Alumni Awards for Law (TOTAL Awardee in Law/Justice) on August 2, 2008, which was the highest award bestowed by the University of Santo Tomas to an alumnus.

See also 

 Supreme Court of the Philippines
 Presidency of Rodrigo Duterte

References

External links 

 Supreme Court Website

1952 births
Living people
Associate Justices of the Supreme Court of the Philippines
Chief justices of the Supreme Court of the Philippines
Colegio de San Juan de Letran alumni
20th-century Filipino judges
People from Laoag
University of Santo Tomas alumni
Justices of the Sandiganbayan
21st-century Filipino judges